The Julia Evelina Smith Parker Translation is considered the first complete translation of the Bible into English by a woman. , she is still the only woman to have translated the entire Bible unaided. The Bible was titled The Holy Bible: Containing the Old and New Testaments; Translated Literally from the Original Tongues, and was published in 1876.

Translator
Julia E. Smith (1792–1886), of Glastonbury, Connecticut had a working knowledge of Latin, Greek and Hebrew. Her father had been a Congregationalist minister before he became a lawyer. Having read the Bible in its original languages, she set about creating her own translation, which she completed in 1855, after a number of drafts. The work is a strictly literal rendering, always translating a Greek or Hebrew word with the same word wherever possible. Smith accomplished this work on her own in the span of eight years (1847 to 1855). She had sought out no help in the venture, even writing, "I do not see that anybody can know more about it than I do."

Smith wanted to be as literal as possible, partially as a result of a failed end-of-the-world prediction by William Miller, which claimed to be based on biblical texts. Smith believed this failure stemmed from straying from the original languages of the Bible, and she set about to create a better translation.

Translation style
Smith's insistence on complete literalness, plus an effort to translate each original word with the same English word, combined with an odd notion of Hebrew tenses (often translating the Hebrew imperfect tense with the English future tense) resulted in a translation that some regard as mechanical and often nonsensical. One notable feature of this translation was the prominent use of the Divine Name, Jehovah, throughout the Old Testament of this Bible version. In 5876 verses Jehovah appears 6934 times in the OT, per e-Sword. For example, Gen 2.4 reads: "These the generations of the heavens and the earth in creating them, in the day of Jehovah God's making the earth and the heavens." This is typical of the wooden rendering in this version.

An example of Smith's literal translation is Jeremiah 22:23:

Publication
Smith began her translation in 1847 and finished it in 1855. The New Testament was published in 1881, the Old Testament in 1884, and the Apocrypha in 1894. In 1876, at 84 years of age, some 21 years after completing her work, she finally sought publication. The publication costs ($4,000) were personally funded by Julia and her sister Abby Smith. The 1,000 copies printed were offered for $2.50 each, but her household auction in 1884 sold about 50 remaining copies.

Importance
The translation was one of only a few contemporary English translations out of the original languages available to English readers until the publication of the Revised Version in 1881–1894. This makes it an invaluable Bible for its period.

The translation fell into obscurity as it was for the most part too literal and lacked any flow.

See also
 Bible translations
 Kimberly Mansion
 Helen Barrett Montgomery

References

External links
 https://web.archive.org/web/20071007124106/http://www.polybiblio.com/pjbooks/9862.html - About Julia Smith's translation of the Bible and her family.
 http://www.bible-researcher.com/ - Overview of translations from the 19th Century
 Julia E. Smith Translation Online
 

1876 non-fiction books
19th-century Christian texts
Bible translations into English